Hartland is a village along the Bark River in Waukesha County, Wisconsin, United States, that is a suburb of Milwaukee. The population was 9,501 at the 2020 census.

Geography
Hartland is located at  (43.100180, −88.344452). It is in the Lake Country area of Waukesha County.

Demographics

2010 census
As of the census of 2010, there were 9,110 people, 3,566 households, and 2,440 families living in the village. The racial makeup of the village was 95.1% White, 0.8% African American, 0.3% Native American, 1.7% Asian, 0.1% Pacific Islander, 0.5% from other races, and 1.4% from two or more races. Hispanic or Latino of any race were 2.9% of the population.

There were 3,566 households, of which 37.3% had children under the age of 18 living with them, 54.4% were married couples living together, 10.2% had a female householder with no husband present, 3.8% had a male householder with no wife present, and 31.6% were non-families. 26.4% of all households were made up of individuals, and 10.2% had someone living alone who was 65 years of age or older. The average household size was 2.55 and the average family size was 3.12.

The median age in the village was 37.5 years. 28% of residents were under the age of 18; 7.3% were between the ages of 18 and 24; 26.4% were from 25 to 44; 28.2% were from 45 to 64; and 10% were 65 years of age or older. The gender makeup of the village was 47.4% male and 52.6% female.

2000 census
As of the census of 2000, there were 7,905 people, 3,002 households, and 2,161 families living in the village. The population density was 1,753.7 people per square mile (676.7/km2). There were 3,140 housing units at an average density of 696.6 per square mile (268.8/km2). The racial makeup of the village was 97.70% White, 0.28% African American, 0.33% Native American, 0.48% Asian, 0.43% from other races, and 0.78% from two or more races. Hispanic or Latino of any race were 1.51% of the population.

There were 3,002 households, out of which 41.3% had children under the age of 18 living with them, 57.4% were married couples living together, 11.0% had a female householder with no husband present, and 28.0% were non-families. 22.3% of all households were made up of individuals, and 7.2% had someone living alone who was 65 years of age or older. The average household size was 2.63 and the average family size was 3.13.

In the village, the population was spread out, with 29.7% under the age of 18, 7.8% from 18 to 24, 33.5% from 25 to 44, 21.5% from 45 to 64, and 7.5% who were 65 years of age or older. The median age was 34 years. For every 100 females, there were 93.7 males. For every 100 females age 18 and over, there were 92.7 males.

The median income for a household in the village was $58,359, and the median income for a family was $67,844. Males had a median income of $48,475 versus $30,253 for females. The per capita income for the village was $26,537. About 1.8% of families and 2.6% of the population were below the poverty line, including 2.2% of those under age 18 and 3.9% of those age 65 or over.

Education
All of Hartland is served by the Arrowhead Union High School District. Different portions of Hartland are in different K-8 districts: Hartland-Lakeside Joint No. 3 School District, Lake Country School District, Swallow School District, and Merton Community School District.

The Arrowhead district's only secondary school is Arrowhead High School. The Arrowhead District has nine feeder schools: North Shore Middle, Swallow, Merton, Lake Country, Stone Bank, Richmond, and North Lake. North Shore Middle School has two feeder schools: Hartland South Elementary, and Hartland North Elementary.

Lake Country Lutheran High School and University Lake School are private schools in Hartland. Divine Redeemer Lutheran School and Zion Lutheran School are K-8 private schools.

Hartland Public Library, located in the downtown village of Hartland is used by some students.

Religion

 Dansk Evangelical Lutheran Kirke, whose building is on the National Register of Historic Places
 Divine Redeemer Lutheran Church & School, a Lutheran Church–Missouri Synod congregation
 First Congregational Church, whose building is on the National Register of Historic Places
 Lake Country Congregational Church, built in 1910 as a Dansk Evangelical Lutheran Kirke
 Lake Country Unitarian Universalist Church
 Oakwood Church
 Our Savior's Evangelical Lutheran Church, an Evangelical Lutheran Church in America congregation
 St. Charles Catholic Church, the only Catholic Church in the village of Hartland
 Westbrook Church
 Zion Evangelical Lutheran Church, a WELS congregation, whose building is listed on the National Register of Historic Places

Recreation

 Nixon Park - land that originally was owned by Dr. H. G. B. Nixon, a doctor whose family settled in Hartland. He donated the land to the village in the 1920s. His old house still stands on Capitol Drive near the downtown area of Hartland.
 Camp Whitcomb/Mason, a Boys and Girls Clubs summer camp, is located near Hartland.

Notable people

 Ben Askren, freestyle and folkstyle wrestler, and MMA fighter
 Ben Bredeson, NFL guard, Baltimore Ravens
 Charles Carpenter, football player for Wisconsin Badgers
 Judson Hall, Wisconsin State Assembly
 Nick Hayden, NFL defensive tackle, Dallas Cowboys
 Doug Henry, retired MLB pitcher; bullpen coach for the Kansas City Royals
 Karen McQuestion, author
 David Merkow, golfer
 Joe Panos, former NFL player
 Molly Seidel, Olympic bronze medalist in the marathon
 Dewey K. Warren, Wisconsin State Assembly
 Stephen Warren, Wisconsin State Assembly

See also
 List of villages in Wisconsin

References

External links

 
 Hartland Area Chamber of Commerce
 Sanborn fire insurance maps: 1894 1899 1905 1914 1922

Villages in Wisconsin
Villages in Waukesha County, Wisconsin